Tullynacross is a small village in County Antrim, Northern Ireland, near Lambeg. In the 2001 Census it had a population of 159 people. It lies within the civil parish of Lambeg, the barony of Castlereagh Upper, and is situated within the Lagan Valley Regional Park and Lisburn and Castlereagh City Council.

Economy
A major Coca-Cola owned bottling plant is sited in Tullynacross. The Deep RiverRock brand of water is bottled there. The plant is adjacent to a lock on the Lagan Canal (also known as the Lagan Navigation).

See also 
List of villages in Northern Ireland
List of towns in Northern Ireland

References 

NI Neighbourhood Information System

Villages in County Antrim
Civil parish of Lambeg
Lisburn City Council